Perseus and Andromeda is a story from Greek myth where Andromeda is saved by Perseus. Among many cultural depictions, it may refer to:

 Perseus and Andromeda (Titian), a painting by Titian of 1554-56
 Perseus and Andromeda (Rubens), a 1622 painting by Peter Paul Rubens
Perseus and Andromeda (Lemoyne), 1723 painting by Francois Lemoyne
 Perseus and Andromeda (Leighton), an 1891 painting by Frederic Leighton, 1st Baron Leighton
 Perseus and Andromeda (video game), a 1983 video game released by Digital Fantasia
 Andromeda (TV Series), a TV series from 2000-2005